Florence Berthout (born 25 June 1962) is a French politician of Soyons libres (SL) who served as mayor of 5th arrondissement of Paris since 2014.

In 2019, Berthout left LR and expressed her support for President Emmanuel Macron.

References

1962 births
Living people
Mayors of arrondissements of Paris
People from Yvelines
Politicians from Île-de-France
Councillors of Paris
Women mayors of places in France